The 2015 MLS SuperDraft was the sixteenth SuperDraft conducted by Major League Soccer. The SuperDraft is held each year in conjunction with the annual National Soccer Coaches Association of America convention. The 2015 convention was held January 14–18, 2015 in Philadelphia, Pennsylvania.

The first two rounds of the SuperDraft took place on January 15, 2015. Rounds three and four took place via conference call on January 20, 2015.

Format
The SuperDraft format has remained constant throughout its history and closely resembles that of the NFL Draft:

Any expansion teams receive the first picks. In 2015, MLS added two expansion teams: New York City FC and Orlando City. As determined by a "Priority Draft" conducted on September 24, 2014, Orlando City had the first overall selection and New York City picked second.
Non-playoff clubs receive the next picks in reverse order of prior season finish.
Teams that make the MLS Cup Playoffs are then ordered by which round of the playoffs they were eliminated.
The winners of the MLS Cup are given the last selection, and the losers the penultimate selection.

Contraction of Chivas USA
MLS contracted the Chivas USA franchise at the conclusion of the 2014 MLS season. On November 7, 2014, MLS announced that all draft picks held by teams in the 2015 SuperDraft after previous trades with Chivas USA would be honored, while the two picks still held by Chivas USA would be deleted. Had Chivas USA not been contracted these selections would have been:
 Round 3, pick #48 - Chivas USA's natural selection.
 Round 4, pick #69 - Chivas USA's natural selection.

Also, draft picks retained by Chivas USA for the 2016 MLS SuperDraft were deleted except for the team's second-round pick which was previously traded to Columbus. That 2016 pick will be selection #11 in round two of the 2016 SuperDraft.

Player selection

Round 1 
Any player marked with a * is part of the Generation Adidas program.

Round 1 trades

Round 2 
Any player marked with a * is part of the Generation Adidas program.

Round 2 trades

Round 3

Round 3 trades

Round 4

Round 4 trades

Unresolved 2015 SuperDraft Pick Trades

 Conditional, Portland Timbers → Seattle Sounders FC. February 20, 2013: Seattle Sounders FC acquired a conditional 2015 draft pick and a first-round selection in the 2014 Supplemental Draft from Portland Timbers in exchange for the MLS rights to defender Mikaël Silvestre.
 Conditional, Real Salt Lake → D.C. United. July 17, 2013: D.C. United acquired a conditional 2015 draft pick and a third-round selection in the 2014 MLS SuperDraft from Real Salt Lake in exchange for defender Brandon McDonald.

Unspecified Year Draft Trade
The trade below was announced without specifying which year or which draft (Super or Supplemental) contains the traded pick. The traded pick was not included in the 2013, 2014, or 2015 MLS drafts.

 Conditional, Seattle Sounders FC → Toronto FC. September 14, 2012: Toronto FC acquired a conditional draft pick and the #10 position in the MLS Allocation Order from Seattle Sounders FC in exchange for the #1 position in the MLS Allocation Order. Seattle used the Allocation pick to select goalkeeper Marcus Hahnemann.

Notable undrafted players

Homegrown players

Others

References

Major League Soccer drafts
SuperDraft
MLS SuperDraft
MLS SuperDraft
Soccer in Pennsylvania
Sports in Philadelphia
Events in Philadelphia
MLS SuperDraft